West Ryde railway station is located on the Main Northern line, serving the Sydney suburb of West Ryde. It is served by Sydney Trains T9 Northern Line services.

History

West Ryde station opened on 17 September 1886 as Ryde, being renamed West Ryde on 8 October 1945. Immediately north of the station, a loop that runs to Epping commences. This opened on 24 October 1978. On 27 November 1989, a southbound loop from Eastwood opened, this resulted in the existing southbound platform being converted to an island platform.

Platforms and services

Signalling
West Ryde Signal Box was a timber structure situated on the city end of Platform 3. Until 1937 it controlled a level crossing on Victoria Road. Also situated at West Ryde was a Water Board siding and a connection to the former tram network, which provided for transfer of vehicles between light and heavy rail systems. It was closed in 1982, when control was transferred to Epping signal box. In 2019, control of this section was transferred to the new Rail Operations Centre at Alexandria.

There are a number of points and crossovers at West Ryde. The two closest to either end of the platforms are the start and end of the Up/Down Suburban. The suburban tracks are used by intercity Central Coast & Newcastle Line trains to overtake slower suburban Northern line trains making all stops. They are also occasionally used to overtake slow moving freight trains. The two crossovers to the south are emergency crossovers which cannot be controlled by the signal box. There are levers beside these crossovers which can be used to terminate trains or run them 'wrong road' (on the track for the opposite direction) if there is an incident on the line ahead.

Transport links
West Ryde has a bus interchange on the western side of the station, rebuilt in the early 2000s. It is served by the following Busways routes:

Stand A
513: to Carlingford
523: to Parramatta station
524: to Parramatta station

Stand B
501: to Railway Square

Stand C
543: to Eastwood station

Ryedale Road
500N Night service to Parramatta station
500N Night service to Hyde Park, Sydney
500X Express service to Hyde Park, Sydney, Sydney
501 to Parramatta station

West Ryde station is served by one NightRide route:
N80: Hornsby station to Town Hall station

Lachlan Valley Railway
During the 1980s West Ryde was the site of the Sydney Depot for the Lachlan Valley Railway. The station used to have a small goods yard servicing a freight shed and a siding running up to the West Ryde Pumping station. The Lachlan Valley Railway vacated the site in August 1987.

References

External links

West Ryde station details Transport for New South Wales

Easy Access railway stations in Sydney
Railway stations in Sydney
Railway stations in Australia opened in 1886
Main North railway line, New South Wales
City of Ryde
West Ryde, New South Wales